Kollur Manjunatha Bhatta Rathnakar (11 April 1931 - 21 September 2010) was an Indian actor and director, known for his work in Kannada film industry. He is best known for his comic roles in movies including Kanyarathna (1963), Satya Harishchandra (1965), Guru Shishyaru (1981), Hosa Belaku (1982) and Halli Meshtru (1992).

Personal life 
Rathnakar was born in Kollur in a family of priests. His father Manjunatha Bhatta was one of the priests at Mookambika Temple, Kollur. Being the only child in the family, Rathnakar refused the job of priest and came to Mysore.

Career

Early days & theatre life 
Rathnakar left home at the age of 12 and came to Mysore. He worked in a Choultry on Seethavilasa road and used to sing near temples in Mysore. Sorat Ashwath and Dikki Madhava Rao who heard his singing, introduced him to theatre personality H.L.N. Simha. Rathnakar became a permanent member of Simha's troupe and went on to act plays with Rajkumar and Pandari Bai.

Entry to films 
Rathnakar made his debut in the 1955 movie Vichitra Prapancha. Apart from comic roles, he also worked as assistant director in many movies. He is famous for his squeaky trembling trademark voice. In his five decade career, Rathnakar has played variety of roles as teacher, singer, priest, palm reader, vendor in more than 300 films. His last movie was Vishnuvardhan's Aptharakshaka in 2010.

Death 
Rathnakar died on 21 September 2010 in Mysore, due to respiratory problems and other age related ailments. Survived by his 3 sons, Rathnakar donated his eyes to JSS hospital eye bank.

Awards 
 2005 - Karnataka Rajyotsava Award by Government of Karnataka
 Aryabhata Award

Selected filmography 
As actor 
 Vichitra Prapancha (1955)
 Dharma Vijaya (1959)
 Dashavatara (1960)
 Veera Kesari (1963)
 Satya Harishchandra
 Katari Veera (1966)
 Katha Sangama (1976)
 Guru Shishyaru (1981)
 Nyaya Ellide (1982)
 Ananda Bhairavi (1983)
 Hosa Jeevana (1990)
 Ganeshana Maduve (1990)
 Ondagona Baa (2003)
 Aptharakshaka (2010)

As director
 Shani Prabhava (1977)
 Bandhavya (1972)
 Bhagya Devathe (1968)

References

External links 
 

Male actors in Kannada cinema
Male actors in Kannada theatre
People from Karnataka
People from Udupi district
20th-century Indian male actors
21st-century Indian male actors
2010 deaths
1931 births